Apisa arabica is a moth of the family Erebidae. It was described by Georg Heinrich Gerhard Warnecke in 1934. It is found in Saudi Arabia.

References

Moths described in 1934
Syntomini
Moths of the Middle East